The 1st Assembly of Gilgit-Baltistan was elected on 12 November 2009 by polls held across the province of Gilgit-Baltistan. That Assembly completed a full five year term from December 2009 to 2015.

Members of the assembly took oath on 10 December 2009.

Party position

List of members of the 1st Assembly of Gilgit-Baltistan. 
Members of the 1st Assembly of Gilgit-Baltistan are shown below

References 

 1st
members of the 1st Assembly of Gilgit-Baltistan